Anolis noblei, the Oriente giant anole or Holguin anole, is a species of lizard in the family Dactyloidae. The species is found in Cuba.

References

Anoles
Reptiles described in 1935
Endemic fauna of Cuba
Reptiles of Cuba
Taxa named by Thomas Barbour
Taxa named by Benjamin Shreve